Boyden Gate is a village in the civil parish of Chislet in Kent, England.

External links

Villages in Kent